Ingwer L. Hansen (August 8, 1912 – February 7, 2000) was an American politician who sat in the Iowa House of Representatives from the 3rd district from 1973 to 1983. He began working for the United States Postal Service in 1930, was in the United States Army during World War II from 1944 to 1946, returned to USPS after military service, and retired in 1972.

References

1912 births
2000 deaths
Republican Party members of the Iowa House of Representatives
20th-century American politicians
United States Postal Service people
People from O'Brien County, Iowa
United States Army personnel of World War II
Military personnel from Iowa